Kvarnsvedens IK is a Swedish football club located in Borlänge in Dalarna County.

Background
Football was first played in 1907 under the name Kvarnsvedens GOIF and this continued until 1935 when operations were shut down for financial reasons. A new club was started in 1936 called Övermora IS and from 1941 matches were played at Kvarnsvedens IP. The same year the name of the club was changed to Kvarnsvedens BK.  However by 1946 the club had closed for financial reasons.

On 25 July 1962 BTK Verdandi application for membership of the Swedish Football Association was approved along with participation in the league system. This was the beginning of what today is Kvarnsvedens Idrottsklubb. BTK Verdandi played their first game against Ulfshyttan på Romme on 6 April 1963 and won 4–2. In 1970 it was decided to change the name of the club from BTK Verdandi to Kvarnsvedens IK.

Since their foundation Kvarnsvedens IK has participated mainly in the middle and lower divisions of the Swedish football league system.  Their best achievements have been third tier football over two seasons in Division 2 Norra in 1987 and 1990 followed by one season in Division 2 Södra Norrland / Västra Norrland in 1991. The club currently plays in Division 2 Norra Svealand which is now the fourth tier of Swedish football. They play their home matches at the Ljungbergsplanen in Borlänge.

Kvarnsvedens IK are affiliated to the Dalarnas Fotbollförbund.

Women's team
The club's women's side gained promotion to the top tier Damallsvenskan for the first time in 2015.

Current squad

Honours
Elitettan (Tier 2)
Winners: 2015

References

External links
 Kvarnsvedens IK – Official website
 Kvarnsvedens IK Facebook

 
Women's football clubs in Sweden
Football clubs in Dalarna County
Damallsvenskan teams
Association football clubs established in 1907
Association football clubs established in 1936